Thomas J. and Elizabeth Nash Farm is located on 626 Ball Street in Grapevine, Texas.  The 5.2-acre farm is now owned by the city and operated by the Grapevine Heritage as a heritage farm museum known as Nash Farm.

The farm was added to the National Register in October 28, 2010.

Photo gallery

See also

National Register of Historic Places listings in Tarrant County, Texas
Recorded Texas Historic Landmarks in Tarrant County

References

External links

National Register of Historic Places in Tarrant County, Texas
Museums in Tarrant County, Texas
Farm museums in Texas
Recorded Texas Historic Landmarks